Dwyran is a village on the island of Anglesey, in north-west Wales, in the community of Rhosyr. Population 2011 census was 603. The first prototype Land Rover off-road vehicle was built Dwyran in 1947.

Notable people 
 John Jones (1818–1898), a Welsh amateur astronomer, born at Bryngwyn Bach, Dwyran

References

Villages in Anglesey
Rhosyr